Monte Reixa is a mountain in Liguria, northern Italy, part of the Ligurian Apennines.

Geography 
The mountain stands on the Adriatic / Ligurian drainage divide between Passo del Faiallo and Monte Beigua. It is located between the provinces of Genoa and Savona, in Liguria, and represents the tripoint where the municipalities of Sassello, Arenzano and Genoa meet. From its northern slopes rises the Orba, a relevant stream of Tanaro basin.

Nature conservation 
Monte Reixa belongs to the Parco naturale regionale del Beigua (Beigua Natural Regional Park).

Access to the summit 

The mountain is easily accessible by signposted traks departing from Passo del Faiallo or Voltri.

The Alta Via dei Monti Liguri, a long-distance trail from Ventimiglia (province of Imperia) to Bolano (province of La Spezia), passes very close to the mountain's summit.

References

Mountains of Liguria
Reixa
Mountains of the Apennines